"Pfano na vhuthihi", was the national anthem of Venda.

Lyrics
Mune wa dzitshaka
Shango lashu Venda
Li nee Mulalo
Vhutali na vhuhali
Vhathu shangoni
Nga vha takale

Pfano na vhuthihi
Nga zwi vhe zwipikwa
U shuma hu pfumbiswe
Zwivhuya zwi ande
Kha masia othe

Hu pfale mulalo

References

National anthems
Historical national anthems
Venda
African anthems
1979 songs

ko:함께 평화를 위해서라면